Anatoli Vladimirovich Zavyalov (born 21 October 1979) is a former Russian professional football player.

Club career
He made his Russian Football National League debut for FC Gazovik-Gazprom Izhevsk on 9 April 2000 in a game against FC Kristall Smolensk.

External links
 

1979 births
People from Neftekamsk
Living people
Russian footballers
Association football midfielders
FC Neftyanik Ufa players
FC Gornyak Uchaly players
FC Ufa players
FC Yenisey Krasnoyarsk players
FC Bashinformsvyaz-Dynamo Ufa players
FC Izhevsk players
FC Zenit-Izhevsk players
Sportspeople from Bashkortostan